is a Japanese animation director, screenwriter, and storyboard artist. 
He is director of Contrail Co. Ltd.
He has been a part-time lecturer at Nihon University College of Art since 2006, and a Project Professor at the college of Art of at the same university since 2018. He has also served as a part-time lecturer at the Graduate School of Tokyo University of the Arts since 2013. 
He is married to a fellow director of anime Chie Uratani.

Biography 

Katabuchi was born in Hirakata, Osaka in 1960.

While studying at Nihon University College of Art's Department of Cinema, he participated in the writing team of Sherlock Hound directed by Hayao Miyazaki. 

After graduating, he joined Telecom Animation Film.
In the same year, Hayao Miyazaki asked him to participate in Nausicaä of the Valley of the Wind as a scriptwriter, but he had to decline for various reasons.
He traveled to the U.S. several times to work on Little Nemo: Adventures in Slumberland, a Japan-U.S. co-production of an animated film produced by Telecom, but decided to leave the company after becoming fed up with the project going astray as it was being pushed around by the American side. 
Then he started working at Mushi Production.

He was seconded to Studio Ghibli from Mushi Productions to work as an assistant director for Hayao Miyazaki on Kiki's Delivery Service in 1989.
Katabuchi was originally going to direct the film, but when the sponsoring company made it clear that they had no intention of investing in anything other than a film directed by Hayao Miyazaki, Katabuchi stepped aside.

Katabuchi joined Studio 4°C in 1992.
Around this time, he was asked to train new directors and animators for Studio Ghibli, which had changed from a system of recruiting freelance staff for each production to a proper company structure and began hiring new employees.
When he finished his work at Ghibli, they wanted him to stay on, but he refused.

He made his directorial debut with the Nippon Animation TV series Famous Dog Lassie in 1996.

He made his feature film directorial debut with Princess Arete.
After working on various outside projects, he returned to Studio 4°C and began work on Princess Arete in 1998. 
The film was released in 2001 and won Excellent Works of the Year in the Domestic Feature Film Category at Tokyo International Anime Fair in 2002. 

After Princess Allyte, Katabuchi moved his main activities to Madhouse.

He directed, composed and wrote the screenplay for Black Lagoon series since 2006.

In 2016, Katabuchi directed In This Corner of the World produced by MAPPA, which was released on November 12, 2016 in Japan, and planned to be released in fifteen countries including UK, France, Germany, Mexico and US.

Awards 
Princess Arete – Tokyo International Anime Fair - Excellent works of the year in Domestic Feature Film Category (2002)
  Mai Mai Miracle - Ottawa International Animation Festival - Prize Winning in Feature Film Competition (2009)
  Mai Mai Miracle - the 14th Japan Media Arts Festival - The Excellence Award in the Animation Division (2010)
  Mai Mai Miracle - 29th Brussels Animation Film Festival - Anima 2010 BETV/Audience Awards for Feature Film Competition (2010)
  Mai Mai Miracle - the 20th Cine Junior International Film Festival - the Audience Award
 In This Corner of the World -  Hiroshima International Film Festival - The Hiroshima Peace Film Award Winner (2016) 
 In This Corner of the World - 90th Kinema Junpo Awards - Best Director / Best Japanese Film (2017)
 In This Corner of the World - 71st Mainichi Film Awards - Ōfuji Noburō Award (2017)
 In This Corner of the World - 59th Blue Ribbon Awards - Best Director (2017)
 In This Corner of the World - 26th Tokyo Sports Film Award -Best Film (2017)
 In This Corner of the World - 40th Japan Academy Prize - Best Animation of the Year (2017)
 In This Corner of the World - 59th Culture of Child Welfare Award - Film/Media category (2017)
 In This Corner of the World - 67th The Minister of Education, Culture, Sports, Science and Technology's Art Encouragement Prize - Film category (2017)

Works

Films 
 Kiki's Delivery Service - Assistant Director, 1989
  - Director, 1998
  - Director, Writer, 2001
  - Director, Writer, 2009
  - Director, Writer, 2016
  - Director, Writer, 2019

Television productions 
 Sherlock Hound - Writer, 1984-1985
 The Blinkins: The Bear And The Blizzard - Director, 1986
 Famous Dog Lassie - Director, 1996
 Black Lagoon - Director, Writer, 2006
 Black Lagoon: The Second Barrage - Director, Writer, 2006

OVA 
 Black Lagoon: Roberta's Blood Trail - Director, Writer, 2010

Video games 
 Ace Combat 04: Shattered Skies (2001) - Director/writer for side-story movie
 Ace Combat 5: The Unsung War (2004) - Story writer
 Ace Combat 7: Skies Unknown (2019) - Story writer

Commercials 
 Panasonic 3CCD lovery size - Animation Director, 2004
 Toyota ITS Ha:mo Concept movie Road to promise - Director, 2012
 NHK  PV of animation version - Director, 2013

Notes

References

External links 
 
 
 

Anime directors
Japanese film directors
Japanese animators
Studio Ghibli people
Studio 4°C
Madhouse (company) people
MAPPA
Nihon University alumni
People from Hirakata
Living people
1960 births